Claribel, Clarabelle, Clarabell or Clarabel may refer to:

People
Claribel (1864-1929), one of the Cone sisters, socialites and noted art collectors
Claribel Kendall (1889-1965), American mathematician
Clarabelle C. B. Lansing, flight attendant and sole fatality in the Aloha Airlines Flight 243 accident
Claribel Medina (born 1961), Puerto Rican actress
Charlotte Alington Barnard (1830-1869), English poet and composer of ballads and hymns under the pseudonym Claribel
Claribel Alegría (1924–2018), pseudonym of Nicaraguan poet, essayist, novelist, and journalist Clara Isabel Alegría Vides (born 1924)

Fictional characters
Clarabelle Cow, a cartoon character created by Walt Disney and Ub Iwerks
Clarabell the Clown, the human partner of Howdy Doody
Clarabel, from The Railway Series of children's books by the Rev. W. Awdry and the related Thomas the Tank Engine and Friends television series
Claribel, mentioned but not seen in Shakespeare's The Tempest
Clarabel Trifle, from Duncall Ball's Selby novel series

Places
Claribel, original name of the city of Richmond Heights, Ohio
Claribel Creek - see List of rivers of Ohio

Other uses
"Claribel" (poem), by Alfred, Lord Tennyson
Saxonette, a soprano clarinet also known as a claribel
Operation Claribel, see List of Special Operations Executive operations in World War II

See also
Clarabella (disambiguation)

English feminine given names